The 1928 Cork Intermediate Hurling Championship was the 19th staging of the Cork Intermediate Hurling Championship since its establishment by the Cork County Board.

Nemo Rangers won the championship following a 5-7 to 0-0 defeat of Buttevant in the final.

Results

Final

References

Cork Intermediate Hurling Championship
Cork Intermediate Hurling Championship